Sar-Sar is a rural locality (a selo) in Chernyayevsky Selsoviet, Kizlyarsky District, Republic of Dagestan, Russia. The population was 538 as of 2010. There are 4 streets.

Geography 
Sar-Sar is located 39 km northeast of Kizlyar (the district's administrative centre) by road. Chernyayevka and Gruzinsky are the nearest rural localities.

Nationalities 
Lezgins live there.

References 

Rural localities in Kizlyarsky District